The Cathedral Church of St. Barnabas is a cathedral of the Roman Catholic Church in the city of Nottingham in Nottinghamshire, England. It is the mother church of the Diocese of Nottingham and seat of the Bishop of Nottingham. The cathedral is a grade-II* listed building.

Location
It is located on the corner of Derby Road and North Circus Street, on the opposite side of which are the Albert Hall and the Nottingham Playhouse (Wellington Circus).

History

It was built between 1841 and 1844, costing £15,000 (equivalent to £ in ), and was first consecrated in 1844, fifteen years after the Catholic Relief Act ended most restrictions on Catholicism in the United Kingdom. A substantial amount of the cost was paid by the important Catholic Lord Shrewsbury. The architect was Augustus Welby Northmore Pugin who also designed the interior of The Houses of Parliament. It was built in the Early English Plain Gothic style, although in contrast, the Blessed Sacrament Chapel was richly decorated and Pugin's later churches were built in that Decorated Gothic style throughout.  Pugin was retained as architect by Rev Robert William Willson, then priest in charge of Nottingham.  In 1842 he was named as Bishop-Elect of Hobart, Tasmania, and had to leave the work in Nottingham before completion.

Following the establishment of a new Catholic hierarchy in England and Wales in 1850 by the decree of Pope Pius IX, it was raised to cathedral status in 1852, becoming one of the first four Catholic cathedrals in England and Wales since the English Reformation. It is the seat of the Bishop of Nottingham.

The cathedral is a Grade II* listed building of the lancet style of architecture Most of Pugin's decorative scheme was destroyed in the upheaval that surrounded the Second Vatican Council, when the old high altar was discarded, and most of the painted decoration smothered and painted plain. Other fittings removed at this time include the old cathedra, as well as the figures of St Mary and St John from the rood screen (the figures were reinstated in 1993). Buildings of England wrote: 'The whole effect could hardly be further from the richness of decoration and atmosphere that Pugin intended'. A fragment of the scheme is preserved in the Blessed Sacrament chapel, and is the highlight of the interior. The replacement high altar from the 1960s was replaced again in 1993 with one in a more sympathetic style. Fragments of Pugin's decoration, such as the roundels in the nave, were uncovered and restored, but most remains lost.

The clergy of the cathedral also serve the church of St. Augustine on Woodborough Road.

Cathedral music 

The cathedral's choral scholarships are available to students above or of eighteen years of age who are in full-time tertiary education in the Nottingham area.

List of Directors of Music
Edmund Hart Turpin 1850 – 1865
James Turpin 1866 – 1873 (afterwards organist of Londonderry Cathedral)
William George Taylor 1874 – 1885 – 1898 – 1905
William Francis Taylor 1905 – 1963
Peter Smedley 1964 – 2003
Neil Page 2003 – 2014
Alex Patterson 2014 – 2020
Gregory Treloar 2020 -

Assistant Directors of Music / Organists 
Peter Smedley 1954 – 1964
Christopher Burton 2008 – 2010
Paul Hayward 2011 – 2012
Alex Patterson 2012 – 2014
Eden Lavelle 2016 – 2017
Eleanor Martin 2019 – present

References

External links

St. Barnabas' Cathedral Official Website
Nottingham Cathedral Music Website
Diocese of Nottingham Official Website
 Audio slideshow tour of St. Barnabas' from the BBC

Nottingham
Nottingham
Tourist attractions in Nottinghamshire
Buildings and structures in Nottinghamshire
Grade II* listed churches in Nottinghamshire
Grade II* listed cathedrals
Roman Catholic churches completed in 1844
19th-century Roman Catholic church buildings in the United Kingdom
Roman Catholic Diocese of Nottingham
Grade II* listed Roman Catholic churches in England
Roman Catholic churches in Nottinghamshire
Augustus Pugin buildings